Vidar Lønn-Arnesen (born 22 June 1940) is a Norwegian singer, radio presenter and television presenter.

He was born in Lardal and grew up in Horten. He started his career as a local entertainer and pirate radio personality in the 1950s. From 1960 to 1964 he was a member of the pop group Tre Tainers.

He was hired in the Norwegian Broadcasting Corporation in 1962. He presented the radio program Ti i skuddet from 1965 to 1970 and 1981 to 1991, and also Musikktelefonen, Western Saloon, Norsktoppen and Alle tiders blinkskudd. From 1991 to 2001 he presented the television program Da Capo. He also hosted the Melodi Grand Prix in 1972, 1973, 1974 and 1977.

In 2010 he was decorated with the King's Medal of Merit in gold. He is married to television producer Tove Lønn-Arnesen and resides at Grav.

References

1940 births
Living people
People from Horten
Norwegian male singers
Norwegian pop singers
Norwegian radio personalities
Norwegian television presenters
NRK people
Recipients of the King's Medal of Merit in gold